Classics is the branch of humanities dealing with the ancient Mediterranean world.

Classics or Classic may also refer to:
Classic, outstanding example of a particular style, something of lasting worth or with a timeless quality
Classics may also refer to the study of classical texts of Confucianism, the mainstay of study in ancient China, Korea, and Japan. Particularly the Four Books and Five Classics or the broader Thirteen Classics.

Music

Albums
Classics (Ali Project album), 2001
Classics (Aphex Twin album), 1994
Classics (Joey Beltram album), 1996
Classics (Era album), 2009
Classics (George Canyon album)
Classics (Hybrid album), 2012
Classics (Jennifer Rush album)
Classics (Kenny Rogers and Dottie West album), 1979
Classics (Model 500 album), 1993
Classics (Patty Loveless album)
Classics (Ratatat album), 2006
Classics (Sarah Brightman album)
Classics (She & Him album)
Classics (Triumph album), 1989
Classics, by Susan Werner
Styx Classics Volume 15, a 1987 compilation for the band Styx,
Classics (Ali Project EP)
 The Classics (album)

Artists and labels
Chronological Classics, a French jazz re-issue label
The Classics, a musical group of the 1960s
Classixx, an electronic record production and DJ Duo

Publishing imprints
Bantam Classic Book Series
Barnes & Noble Classics series
Everyman Classics
Oxford World's Classics
Penguin Classics
Signet Classics

Sports

American Classic Races, a series of three Thoroughbred horse races
British Classic Races, five horse races run during the traditional flat racing season
Classic cycle races, one-day professional cycling road races in the international calendar
Swedish Classic Circuit,  a diploma awarded to those who have finished races in cross country skiing, cycling, swimming, and cross country running during a 12-month period

Video games
Classics HD, a group of classic PlayStation 2 video games, remastered in high-definition for PlayStation 3
PlayStation 2 classics, a group of classic PlayStation 2 video games
PSone Classics, a group of classic PlayStation video games

See also
Classic (disambiguation)
Classical (disambiguation)